Morecambe Ladies FC were established in 2005, originally named Lancaster & Morecambe Ladies FC. Sophie Fish set up the club to enable local girls to play football due to a lack of female clubs at that time. Two years after the club was formed they were approached by Morecambe FC to join the men's club.

History

2022 -
On September 15, 2022 Morecambe F.C. announced a partnership with Morecambe LFC to formally bring them into the clubs fold and rename them to Morecambe F.C. Women.

Kit and main sponsors

Players

Current squad

Best Performances
FA Women's National League Division One North
7th Place: 2016-17, 2017-18'''

References

Morecambe F.C.
Association football clubs established in 2005
Women's football clubs in England
2005 establishments in England